This is a list of notable current and former rallycross drivers, many of whom have competed or are competing in the European Rallycross Championship.

Drivers

Rallycross drivers
Rallycross